The speaker of the Parliament of Albania is the head of the Parliament whose term coincides with the term of the Parliament and they are elected by a vote during the opening session. If the president is temporarily absent or incapable of exercising his or her powers, the speaker takes over the functions of the office, as specified by the Constitution. 
Since the first multi-party elections held after the collapse of the Communist rule, there have been eight speakers of the Parliament. As of 10 September 2021, the speaker of the Parliament is Lindita Nikolla.

List of speakers (1920–present)

See also 
 Politics of Albania
 Constitution of Albania
 Parliament of Albania

References 

Speaker
Albania
Albania